Fredericksburg, also known as Clover Creek, is an unincorporated community and census-designated place (CDP) in Blair County, Pennsylvania, United States. It was first listed as a CDP prior to the 2020 census.

The CDP is in southeastern Blair County, in the northeastern part of North Woodbury Township.

The community is in the valley of Clover Creek, which flows north to join the Frankstown Branch Juniata River at Cove Forge.

Demographics

References 

Census-designated places in Blair County, Pennsylvania
Census-designated places in Pennsylvania